Stagmomantis californica, common name California mantis, is a species of praying mantis in the family Mantidae that is native to the western United States.

Description
Adult members of this species range in size from 2-3 inches in body length. There are green, yellow, and brown varieties, with subadults and adults tending to have dark transverse bands on the top of the abdomen. The wings of both sexes are mottled or suffused with dark brown or black and the hindwings are purplish. The inner forelegs are orangish, and there are some black spots near the mandibles. In most other physical respects they closely resemble other members of their mantid order, two of which are native to the state of California (the others are the slightly smaller Stagmomantis carolina and the larger and more common Stagmomantis limbata). The oothecae and hatchlings are different than those of S. limbata.

Habitat
Within California, this common insect occurs throughout the warmer and drier regions of the southern part of the state below elevations of 10,000 feet.  They prefer chaparral and desert environments with sufficient vegetation (the creosote bush is a favorite) in which they can climb, hide, and hunt.  Their range extends from all of southern California north into the Central Valley and then eastward into Arizona, New Mexico, Colorado, and western Texas. In the late 1980s, they began showing up in southern Idaho, and appear to be migrating northward, adapting to the colder winters along the way.  Also found in Mexico.

Behavior and ecology
Like all mantids, the California mantis is carnivorous, consuming virtually any other insect it perceives as small enough to be eaten, including other members of its own species.  Males and females come together to reproduce but otherwise the adults are strictly solitary.  Nymphs hatch in the spring from hard egg cases laid the previous fall.  Adults do not overwinter—lifespan is seldom more than one year and usually less than nine months, with females sometimes surviving longer into the winter season than males, presumably allowing the females more time to lay their oothecas on suitable vegetation or rocks before dying.  Though fast runners, both sexes have wings and are capable of flight (though this form of movement is energy intensive and seldom utilized). Males are especially good flyers: the wings of the male extend well beyond the end of the abdomen, whereas those of the female do not extend more than half this distance.  Males are often attracted to bright lights at night and can sometimes be found swarming around them along with other insects, though as ambush hunters, they fly at night primarily for dispersal and not in search of food-- those swarming around lights are disoriented, behaving as though the light is actually the moon and attempting to fly in a straight line.

When the Stagmomantis californica mate, the mount can last for hours. Often during or after mating the female S. californica devours the male, allowing the female to have enough protein to create an ootheca. All S. californica have sensors near their legs that allow the praying mantis to lose its head and still function.

References

Mantidae
Mantodea of North America
Insects of the United States
Fauna of the Western United States
Fauna of California
Fauna of the California chaparral and woodlands
Fauna of the Mojave Desert
Natural history of the Central Valley (California)
Insects described in 1909